Ayman Sabawi Ibrahim Hasan (born 21 October 1971) is Saddam Hussein's half-nephew and a suspected guerrilla. Ayman's father is Sabawi Ibrahim al-Tikriti, Saddam's half-brother. Ayman was suspected of aiding the Iraqi Insurgency and was arrested in early May 2005 during a raid north of Tikrit.

While serving a life sentence in a northern Iraqi prison, Ayman escaped with the help of a police officer on 9 December 2006.

References

External links
Ayman Sabawi, Saddam's Nephew, Breaks Out of Jail in Iraq
Prison chief held after Saddam's nephew escape
Saddam's nephew makes prison break

Living people
1971 births
Iraqi people of Arab descent
Tulfah family
Iraqi Sunni Muslims
Iraqi prisoners sentenced to life imprisonment
Prisoners sentenced to life imprisonment by Iraq
Iraqi escapees
Escapees from Iraqi detention